the 2023 UNAF U-20 Women's Tournament is the upcoming second edition of the UNAF U-20 Women's Tournament, the international women's youth football championship contested by the under-20 national teams of the member associations of UNAF (North Africa), the tournament was originally scheduled to run from 11 to 18 February 2023. However, the tournament was postponed indefinitely due to the inability of the Tunisian  Football Federation to host the tournament in that period of time adding to the lack of interest shown by the participating members.
The tournament was later rescheduled and to be held from 13 to 20 March 2023 in Sousse, Tunisia.

Morocco are the defending champions having won the inaugural tournament back in 2019.

Participating nations
On 25 December 2022, it was initially announced that all UNAF's member associations will compete in the tournament alongside CECAFA's Sudan (who were scheduled to make their maiden international debut in the tournament). Tanzania were also reported to be invited to the tournament. On 22 February 2023, UNAF confirmed the participation of four teams in the UNAF U-20 Women's Tournament. with Egypt debuting in the tournament.

Venues
Sousse was initially confirmed as the host city on 2 February 2023. however, on 13 March 2023 CAF announced that the tournament would take place in Al-Kram Stadium in Le Kram, Tunis, Tunisia.

Squads

Players born between 1 January 2003 and 31 December 2007 are eligible to compete in the tournament.

Match officials
On 7 March 2023, UNAF announced a total of 4 referees and 9 assistant referees appointed for the tournament.

Referees

  Ghada Mehat
  Noura Samir
  Amina Fakhr
  Emna Ajbouni

Assistant referees

  Sarah Belmady
  Marwa Matallah
  Naglaa Fathy
  Nourhan ElSayed
  Fadwa Amish
  Khadija Oriefy
  Khadija Ourd
  Shefya El-Amry
  Aya Khadry
  Safa Abidi

Main Tournament
The match schedule was announced by UNAF on 22 February 2023 without kick-off times.

All times are local, CET (UTC+1)

Goalscorers

References

External links 
انعقاد الاجتماع الفني لدورة اتحاد شمال افريقيا لكرة القدم للمنتخبات النسائية تحت 20 عاما - unafonline.org

2023 in women's association football
2023 in youth association football
2023 in Tunisian sport
International association football competitions hosted by Tunisia
UNAF